Willy Kaiser (16 January 1912 – 24 July 1986) was a German boxer who competed in the 1936 Summer Olympics.

Kaiser was born in Pudewitz, Province of Posen, German Empire. He won the gold medal in the flyweight class after winning the final against Gavino Matta in 1936.

1936 Olympic results
Below is the record of Willy Kaiser, a German flyweight boxer who competed at the 1936 Berlin Olympics:

Round of 32: bye
Round of 16: Defeated Guillermo López (Chile) referee stopped contest in round 3
Quarterfinal: Defeated Fidel Tricánico (Uruguay) on points
Semifinal: Defeated Alfredo Carlomagno (Argentina) on points
Final: Defeated Gavino Matta (Italy) on points (won gold medal)

References
 profile

1912 births
1986 deaths
People from the Province of Posen
People from Pobiedziska
Sportspeople from Greater Poland Voivodeship
Flyweight boxers
Olympic boxers of Germany
Boxers at the 1936 Summer Olympics
Olympic gold medalists for Germany
Olympic medalists in boxing
German male boxers
Medalists at the 1936 Summer Olympics